Kyrylo Bohatenko (born 15 April 1988) is a Ukrainian footballer.

Career
Bohatenko played one season for FC Academia UTM Chişinău. He was signed by Russian First Division side FC Dynamo Bryansk in March 2008.

See also
Football in Ukraine
List of football clubs in Ukraine

References

External links

Statistics at Moldova Sports
Profile at KLISF

1988 births
Living people
Moldovan people of Ukrainian descent
Ukrainian footballers
Ukrainian expatriate footballers
Expatriate footballers in Moldova
Moldovan footballers
Moldovan expatriate footballers
Expatriate footballers in Russia
Association football midfielders
FC Dynamo Bryansk players